The Mar Augustine Kandathil Memorial Lisie Hospital is a hospital near Kaloor, in Kochi, India. It was founded in memory of Mar Augustine Kandathil, shortly after his demise, according to his original vision and plans, in 1957, as a token of his devotion to St. Thérèse de Lisieux. It is managed by the Archdiocese of Ernakulam.
Lisie Hospital is a tertiary referral hospital and one of the largest in Cochin. The Lisie Heart Institute is a major interventional Cardiology and Cardiothoracic centre. It performed nearly 4000 interventional cardiac procedures and cardiac surgeries in 2006. Their team of doctors was reconstituted in 2008 with the joining of Jose Chacko Periappuram as the Head of Cardiac Surgery and Jacob Abraham as the head of Cardiac Anaesthesia. The present team was instrumental in performing the first total arterial bypass surgery on a beating heart and heart transplantation under Dr. Jose Chacko in the state of Kerala.

Facilities
The hospital have departments including Anaesthesia, Cardiac Anaesthesiology, Cardio Thoracic Surgery, Cardiology, Pulmonary Medicine, Critical Care Medicine, Dentistry, Dermatology, Diabetology, Emergency Medicine, ENT, Gastroenterology, Nephrology, Neurology, Neurosurgery, Obstetrics & Gynaecology, Orthopaedics, Urology, Radiology, Medical Social Work, Oncology, Pain & Palliative, Pathology, Gastrointestinal Surgery and Ophthalmology. Department of Cardiac Anaesthesiology is one of the largest Cardio thoracic practices in South India. The general medicine department handles 50,000 outpatients and 5,000 inpatients every year.

Lisie Medical and Educational institutions
Educational institutions within the hospital include;
Lisie College Of Nursing
Lisie School Of Nursing
Lisie College Of Pharmacy
Lisie School Of Paramedical Science
Lisie College Of Allied Health Sciences.

Lisie Heart Institute
The Lisie Heart Institute is a tertiary care Interventional Cardiology and Cardiac Surgery Unit at the Mar Augustine Memorial Lisie Hospital. The Heart Institute is one of the leading centres for Interventional cardiology and Cardiac surgery in the state of Kerala. It was set up in 2002 and has since then performed more than 14,000 interventional procedures and 3800 Cardiac surgeries until 2007.

References

External links

History of its origins

Hospital buildings completed in 1957
Archdiocese of Ernakulam-Angamaly
Hospitals in Kochi
Hospitals established in 1957
1957 establishments in Kerala
20th-century architecture in India